Kim Dong-hyeon, Kim Dong-hyun or Kim Tong-hyŏn may also refer to:

 Dong Hyun Kim (born 1981), South Korean mixed martial arts fighter
 Kim Dong-hyun (bobsledder) (born 1987), South Korean bobsledder
 Kim Dong-hyun (footballer, born 1984), South Korean football player
 Kim Dong-hyun (footballer, born 1997), South Korean football player
 Kim Dong-hyun (tennis) (born 1978), South Korean tennis player
 Kim Dong-hyeon (footballer, born 1994), South Korean football player
 Kim Dong-hyeon (luger) (born 1991), South Korean luger
 Kim Dong-hyun (actor) (born 1989), leader of South Korean boy band Boyfriend
 Kim Dong-hyeon (born 1998), birth name of the singer MC Gree
 Kim Dong-hyun (singer, born 1998), member of South Korean duo MXM and AB6IX
 Dong Hyun Kim (fighter, born 1988),  mixed martial artist
 Kim Dong-hyun (table tennis), table tennis player